William Battie-Wrightson (6 October 1789 – 10 February 1879) was a British landowner and Whig politician.

He was the elder son of William Wrightson of Cusworth Hall, near Doncaster, MP for Aylesbury. He undertook the Grand Tour of Europe with his sister, Harriet, from 1816 to 1817. Battie-Wrightson was educated at Trinity College, Cambridge (1812), and trained for the law at Lincoln's Inn, being called to the bar in 1815. He succeeded his father to the Cusworth estate in 1827.

He was elected MP for East Retford in 1826 and then sat for Kingston upon Hull from 1830 to 1832 and for Northallerton from 1835 to 1865.

He married Georgiana, the daughter of Inigo Freeman Thomas of Ratton Park, Sussex.

References

External links 
 

1789 births
1879 deaths
Liberal Party (UK) MPs for English constituencies
UK MPs 1826–1830
UK MPs 1830–1831
UK MPs 1831–1832
UK MPs 1835–1837
UK MPs 1837–1841
UK MPs 1841–1847
UK MPs 1847–1852
UK MPs 1852–1857
UK MPs 1857–1859
UK MPs 1859–1865
Alumni of Trinity College, Cambridge
Members of Lincoln's Inn
Whig (British political party) MPs for English constituencies
19th-century English landowners
People from the Metropolitan Borough of Doncaster